Renée de Dinteville, (15??-1580), was a German-Roman monarch as Princess Abbess of the Imperial Remiremont Abbey in France. 

She belonged to the local noble family of courtiers in Lorraine, and she was elected Coadjutrice in 1565, and succeeded as abbess in 1570, upon pressure from duke Charles III of Lorraine. She was forced to accept Barbara of Salm as her successor in 1579.

References 
   Worldwide Guide to Women in Leadership. Women in power

Year of birth missing
1580 deaths
Abbesses of Remiremont